Mahmud Xhelaledini was a 20th-century Albanian politician who worked for the Ottoman Empire.

Born in Gjirokastër in 1870, Xhelaledin had studied in Thessaloniki. After undergoing the Ottoman school of public administration there, he became kaymakam of Gilan (now Gnjilane) in the vilayet of Kosovo in the 1901-1903 period. During 1904-1912 he instead had different posts at the Thessaloniki vilayet.

References

1870 births
Year of death missing
People from Gjirokastër
People from Janina vilayet
Politicians of the Ottoman Empire
Albanians from the Ottoman Empire
19th-century Albanian politicians
20th-century Albanian politicians